Villa Col dei Canali (also Col de’ Canali) is a  of the  of Costacciaro in the Province of Perugia, Umbria, central Italy. It stands at an elevation of 559 metres above sea level. At the time of the Istat census of 2001 it had 253 inhabitants.

References 

Frazioni of the Province of Perugia